Club Atlético Valdemoro is a Spanish football club based in Valdemoro, in the autonomous community of Madrid. Founded in 1966, it currently plays in Primera de Aficionados, holding home games at Estadio Municipal de Valdemoro, with a capacity for 3,000 spectators.

History
Atlético Valdemoro was founded in 1966 under the name Agrupación Deportiva Valdemoro. It spent its entire existence fluctuating between Tercera División and the regional leagues, appearing in the Segunda División B promotion playoffs in 1990–91.

In the Copa del Rey, Valdemoro played against the likes of Real Betis and Atlético de Madrid, both in the 80s.

Season to season13 seasons in Tercera División

Segunda División B Promotion Playoffs

1990–91

UniformsFirst kit: Red shirt with white stripes, blue shorts and red socks.Alternative kit': White shirt, blue shorts and white socks.

External links
Official website
FF Madrid team profile 

Football clubs in the Community of Madrid
Divisiones Regionales de Fútbol clubs
Association football clubs established in 1966
1966 establishments in Spain